Edmond Decottignies (3 December 1893 – 3 June 1963) was a French weightlifter who competed in the 1924 Summer Olympics. He was born in Comines.

Decottignies won a gold medal in the lightweight class in 1924. He became French champion in 1921, 1923, and 1924. In memory of him, there is the yearly international tournament "Mémorial Edmond Decottignies" held in Comines.

References

External links
Profile

1893 births
1963 deaths
French male weightlifters
Olympic weightlifters of France
Olympic gold medalists for France
Weightlifters at the 1924 Summer Olympics
Olympic medalists in weightlifting
Medalists at the 1924 Summer Olympics